Oliver Butterworth may refer to:
 Oliver Butterworth (writer), American children's author and educator
 Oliver Butterworth (violinist), British violinist, music educator, and arts administrator